Mangohick Church, also known as Mangohick Baptist Church, is a historic Baptist church located in the community of Mangohick, King William County, Virginia.  It was constructed in 1730, and is a one-story, rectangular brick building with a steep gable roof.  It measures 61 feet by 21 feet. Originally built for an Episcopalian congregation, it was apparently abandoned by them soon after the Disestablishment. The church remains in active use.

Bricks used to build the church were purported to have been shipped from England during colonial times. It was listed on the National Register of Historic Places in 1972.
During the Civil War, General Grant pitched his tent near the church, on May 27, 1864, as he maneuvred South and East of General Lee in the prelude to the Battle of Cold Harbor.

References

External links
Mangohick Baptist Church, State Route 638, Mangohick, King William County, VA: 1 photo at Historic American Buildings Survey

Historic American Buildings Survey in Virginia
Baptist churches in Virginia
Churches completed in 1730
Buildings and structures in King William County, Virginia
Churches on the National Register of Historic Places in Virginia
National Register of Historic Places in King William County, Virginia
18th-century Baptist churches in the United States
1730 establishments in the Thirteen Colonies